The Kenya national cricket team toured Scotland in 2008. They played one first class match and two One Day Internationals against Scotland.

Only First Class Match

ODI series

1st ODI

2nd ODI

Kenyan cricket tours abroad